William Barne may refer to:

 William Barnes (died 1558), or William Barne, English Member of Parliament (MP)
William Barne (died 1562), or William Berners, English MP
William Barne (died 1619), English MP

See also
William Barnes (disambiguation)